Tania Maria (born May 9, 1948) is a Brazilian artist, singer, composer, bandleader and piano player, singing mostly in Portuguese or English. Her Brazilian-style music is mostly vocal, sometimes pop, often jazzy, and includes samba, bossa, Afro-Latin, pop and jazz fusion.

Biography

Born in São Luís, Maranhão, Brazil, Tania Maria began playing the piano at the age of seven, became a leader at the age of 13, when her band of professional musicians, organized by her father, won first prize in a local music contest and went on to play for dances, in clubs and on the radio. Her father, a metal worker and a gifted guitarist and singer, had encouraged her to study piano so that she could play in his weekend jam sessions, where she first absorbed the rhythms and melodies of samba, jazz, pop music and Brazilian chorinho. Since then, she has never worked in anyone else's group. She has a degree in law, married early and had children.

Maria's first album, Apresentamos (We Present), was released in Brazil in 1969, followed by Olha Quem Chega (Look Who's Here!) in 1971, but it was a move to Paris, France, in 1974 that exploded her onto the international scene. At a concert in Australia, her formidable musical precision and freewheeling spirit caught the attention of the late American guitarist, Charlie Byrd, who recommended her to the late Carl Jefferson, founder of Concord Records.

Tania's 1983 album Come With Me started her international breakthrough with the title song becoming a 1980s dance-floor classic that has since been covered frequently. A year later, in 1984, her Love Explosion album contained the track Deep Cove View which was promoted by Robbie Vincent on his late Sunday night soul shows on Radio 1.  The 1985 album Made in New York increased her popularity further worldwide.

Maria has played virtually every important jazz festival in the world and has appeared on countless television and radio programmes. She has recorded more than 25 albums and in 1985 was nominated for a Grammy Award in the category "Best Jazz Vocal Performance, Female". She has performed at venues such as the Blue Note and festivals including the Monterey Jazz Festival in 1981, 1983 and 1989, Saratoga Jazz Festival, JVC Jazz Fest 1991, Montreux Jazz Festival, New Orleans Jazz & Heritage Festival, Newport Jazz Festival in 1975, Puerto Rico Heineken Jazzfest 2001, Malta Jazz Festival 2003 at Maltese Islands, Novosadski Jazz Festival 2004, Belgium's Jazz Middelheim 2007. She performed at the annual North Sea Jazz Festival in The Hague in 1978 and has returned there at least 10 times. She has played with such as Steve Gadd, Anthony Jackson, Sammy Figueroa and Eddie Gómez.

Discography

Albums

Filmography 
 2008 Tanya Maria: The Beat of Brazil with Laurindo Almeida

See also
 Chiclete com banana (song)

References

External links 
  – broken link - archived taniamaria.net 2005 archived taniamaria.org 2017
 Tania Maria at All About Jazz
 
  – at the North Sea Jazz festival

1948 births
Living people
Brazilian women pianists
Brazilian jazz pianists
Brazilian jazz singers
Jazz-pop pianists
Jazz-pop singers
Latin jazz pianists
Latin jazz singers
People from São Luís, Maranhão
Post-bop pianists
Post-bop singers
Bossa nova singers
Música Popular Brasileira pianists
Música Popular Brasileira singers
Women jazz pianists
Brazilian jazz composers
20th-century Brazilian women singers
20th-century Brazilian singers
21st-century Brazilian women singers
21st-century Brazilian singers
21st-century pianists
Women in Latin music
20th-century women pianists
21st-century women pianists